Kenora Transit is a small public transportation system in the city of Kenora in Northwestern Ontario, Canada, close to the Manitoba border and less than  east of Winnipeg. Service consists of three bus routes which operate between 7:00am and 6:30pm on weekdays, with a later start on Saturdays. There is no transit service on Sundays or public holidays. Handi Transit provides transportation for residents who are unable to access the regular transit bus.

Routes
 Pine Crest
 Keewatin
 Lakeside / East Highway

Fleet

See also

 Public transport in Canada

References

External links
 Transit History of Kenora, Ontario
 Transithub Kenora Transit Photo Gallery

Transit agencies in Ontario
Transport in Kenora